Galloni is an Italian surname. Notable people with the surname include:

 Alessandra Galloni (born 1974), Italian journalist
 Antonio Galloni, American wine critic
 Giovanni Galloni (1927–2018), former Italian Minister of Education

See also
 Gallone, surname

Italian-language surnames